Mon Ket, also known as Dany, is a 2018 Belgian drama film directed by François Damiens in his directorial debut. It was written by Damiens with Benoît Mariage. It was screened at the 2018 CPH PIX Film Festival. It received three nominations at the 9th Magritte Awards in the categories of Best Film, Best Actor for François Damiens, and Most Promising Actor for Matteo Salamone.

In France, the film finished third at the box office in its opening weekend, behind Solo: A Star Wars Story and Deadpool 2.

Cast
 François Damiens as Daniel "Dany" Versavel
 Matteo Salamone as Sullivan Versavel
 Tatiana Rojo as Patience
 Christian Brahy as the godfather
 Nancy Sluse as Nancy

References

External links
 

2018 films
2018 drama films
Belgian drama films
French drama films
2010s French-language films
2018 directorial debut films
2010s French films